Dhritikanta Lahiri Choudhury (10 September 1931 – 1 March 2019) was an Indian Bengali author and expert on Indian elephants.

Biography
Lahiri Choudhury was born to Dhirendrakanta and Renuka Debi in 1931 in village of Kalipur in the Mymensingh district. After the partition of Bengal his family shifted to Kolkata. He passed M.A. in English literature from Presidency College and completed Ph.D. from the University of Leeds. He served as a professor of Rabindra Bharati University. Lahiri Choudhury travelled over seventy years in the forests of Assam, Barak Valley, West Bengal, Meghalaya, Arunachal Pradesh and Orissa as well as Uttaranchal, Bandipur and Periyar. He gathered huge experiences with elephants and surveyed the status and distribution of elephants, studied man-elephant conflicts and analysed the problems of elephants in India. His books The Great Indian Elephant Book and A Trunk Full of Tales: Seventy Years with the Indian Elephant are considered guidebooks on managing elephants. Lahiri Choudhury wrote two Bengali books Hatir Boi and Jiboner Indradhanu. He also researched Architecture of Calcutta. In 1977 he became a member of the International Union for Conservation of Nature (IUCN) specialist group on elephants and of the advisory committee of Project Elephant under the Government of India in 2004. Lahiri Choudhury received Ananda Purashakar in 2007 for Hatir Boi.

Lahiri Choudhury died on 1 March 2019 at the age of 87.

References

1931 births
2019 deaths
Indian naturalists
Indian conservationists
Bengali-language writers
Bengali writers
University of Calcutta alumni
Alumni of the University of Leeds
Recipients of the Ananda Purashkar
People from Mymensingh District
Writers from Kolkata